Jamaica requires its residents to register their motor vehicles and display vehicle registration plates. Current plates are North American standard 6 × 12 inches (152 × 300 mm).

Regular license plates 
The current series of license plates for private cars (introduced in 1987) has the format 1234AB. Coding is not provided. The plates have American dimensions and blue font on a white background.
For motorcycles, the 1234 A series is valid, also without coding and in a similar color scheme.

Until 1987, the AB1234 format was in effect, where the prefix A meant the region of registration.
Until 1973, the A1234 format was in effect, where the prefix A meant the region of registration.

Other license plates

Coding

Public transport 
Taxis, public buses, etc. have license plates of the РА1234, РА123В, 1234РА formats. The plates have a red background and white letters and numbers.

Commercial transport 
Cargo and other commercial vehicles have license plates of the CA1234, CA123B formats. The plates have a green background and white letters and numbers.

License plates of motor vehicle sellers 
Temporary license plates used for permanent registration have the DA1234 format. The plates have a blue background and white letters and numbers.

License plates of rental vehicles 
License plates for vehicle intended for rental have the format RR1234. The plates have a white background and green letters and numbers. The inscription "RENTAL" is located under the main line of symbols.
For motorcycles, the 1234 R series is available in a similar color scheme.

Government transport 
Government vehicles have number plates in the format 12 3456. The prefix 12 means belonging to a specified government structure. The plates have a yellow background and black letters and numbers. Below the main line of symbols is the inscription "JAMAICA GOVT". The police use government license plates.

Military transport 
Military number plates have a British scheme similar to that used in Trinidad and Tobago. Military license plate format 1JDF2, 1 JDF23, 1 JDF234, 12JDF3, 12JDF34, 12 JDF345. JDF — Jamaica Defense Force. License plates have a black background and white symbols, and are usually painted directly on the vehicle.

See also 
 Vehicle registration plate

Links 
 Number plates

References

Jamaica
Transport in Jamaica
Jamaica transport-related lists